Stick of Truth may refer to:

 Stick of Truth (Grand Targhee), a snow depth indicator for Grand Targhee Resort, a ski area in western Wyoming, U.S.
 South Park: The Stick of Truth